This is a sortable list of films produced in Angola, many in the Portuguese language.

Features

Mediums and Shorts

Films set in Angola

See also

Cinema of Angola
Culture of Angola
List of African films

External links
 Angolan film at the Internet Movie Database

 
Films
Angola
Angola